A Darwin machine (a 1987 coinage by William H. Calvin, by analogy to a Turing machine) is a machine that, like a Turing machine, involves an iteration process that yields a high-quality result, but, whereas a Turing machine uses logic, the Darwin machine uses rounds of variation, selection, and inheritance.
 
In its original connotation, a Darwin machine is any process that bootstraps quality by utilizing all of the six essential features of a Darwinian process:  A pattern is copied with variations, where populations of one variant pattern compete with another population, their relative success biased by a multifaceted environment (natural selection) so that winners predominate in producing the further variants of the next generation (Darwin's inheritance principle).

More loosely, a Darwin machine is a process that utilizes some subset of the Darwinian essentials, typically natural selection to create a non-reproducing pattern, as in neural Darwinism. Many aspects of neural development utilize overgrowth followed by pruning to a pattern, but the resulting pattern does not itself create further copies.

Darwin machine has been used multiple times to name computer programs after Charles Darwin.

See also
 Artificial life
 Artificial intelligence
"Darwin among the Machines"
 Evolutionary computation
 Evolutionary algorithm
 Genetic algorithm
 Universal Darwinism

References and external links

 William H. Calvin (1987), "The brain as a Darwin Machine", Nature 330:33-34.
 William H. Calvin (1997) "The Six Essentials? Minimal Requirements for the Darwinian Bootstrapping of Quality,"  Journal of Memetics 1:1.
 George B. Dyson (1998), Darwin Among the Machines: The Evolution of Global Intelligence (Perseus 1997)(1998) .
 J. M. Manier (1996), Reason and Instinct (Robert Wright's The Moral Animal and Henry Plotkin's Darwin, Machines and the Nature of Knowledge). THEORY AND PSYCHOLOGY. 6 (2): 347-348. ISSN 0959-3543
 Henry Plotkin (1994), Darwin Machines and the Nature of Knowledge (Harvard University Press.  
 Henry Plotkin & Nicholas S. Thompson (1995), Darwin Machines and the Nature of Knowledge. Contemporary Psychology. 40 (12), 1179.
 E. A. Smith (1995), Darwin Machines and the Nature of Knowledge (Henry C. Plotkin). Politics and the Life Sciences : the Journal of the Association for Politics and the Life Sciences. 14 (2), 296. ISSN 0730-9384

History of artificial intelligence
Cybernetics
Emergence
Evolution